Benjamin "Ben" Rix (born 11 December 1983 in Wolverhampton) is an English former professional footballer who played most recently for League One side Crewe Alexandra until he was released by mutual consent on 22 January 2009. He played as a midfielder.

Career
Rix joined Crewe Alexandra as a schoolboy, signing as a professional in January 2001. He made his debut in October and make 22 appearances in his first season, most as a substitute. The following season, he was more involved with the team starting 17 games and making six appearances as a substitute. He was developing well and was a regular the next season but a number of injuries limited his appearances. He did not make a single appearance in 2005–06 because of injury and he moved to Scarborough and AFC Bournemouth on loan.

On 22 January 2009, Crewe Alexandra confirmed that Rix had left the club by mutual consent.

In September 2009 Rix signed for Cornish South West Peninsula League Premier Division side St. Blazey A.F.C.

On 3 March 2010 Rix announced his retirement from the game.

References

External links
Ben Rix player profile at crewealex.net

1982 births
Living people
Footballers from Wolverhampton
English footballers
Association football midfielders
Crewe Alexandra F.C. players
Scarborough F.C. players
AFC Bournemouth players
Nea Salamis Famagusta FC players
Expatriate footballers in Cyprus
Cypriot Second Division players